Carriedo station is an elevated Manila Light Rail Transit (LRT) station situated on Line 1. The station is located along the district boundary of Santa Cruz and Quiapo in Manila.

It is one of the five stations in the line to have its concourse area below the platform, the other four being Baclaran, Central Terminal, Balintawak, and Roosevelt.

Description
Carriedo is the first station north of the Pasig River. It is the tenth station for trains headed to Roosevelt and the eleventh station for trains headed to Baclaran. It is named after Carriedo Street, which crosses below it. It is also the only station on the entire line with a canopy roof with the others being fully-roofed. Like Balintawak, Central Terminal, Roosevelt and Doroteo Jose stations, commuters don't have to go down to street level to go across from one platform to another, without paying another fare (except for Doroteo Jose).

Near the station are historic landmarks such as Santa Cruz Church, Quiapo Church, Escolta Street and Plaza Lacson. The station is directly connected to Good Earth Plaza and Plaza Fair shopping centers via walkway. It is located near various retailers including SM Quiapo and Isetann Carriedo, as well as institutions such as FEATI University and Universidad de Manila Henry Sy Sr. Campus.

Transportation links
Due to Carriedo station's location being near three districts, namely, Santa Cruz, Binondo, and Quiapo, the station is served by many forms of public transport. Buses serving the Taft Avenue and Rizal Avenue routes and nearby routes, jeepneys, taxis, tricycles, and kalesas stop at and around the station. Kalesas and tricycles are particularly used in Binondo, due to the district's narrow streets.

See also

List of rail transit stations in Metro Manila
Manila Light Rail Transit System

Manila Light Rail Transit System stations
Railway stations opened in 1985
Buildings and structures in Santa Cruz, Manila
Buildings and structures in Quiapo, Manila
1985 establishments in the Philippines